Cauley is a surname in the English language. It is an Anglicised form of the Irish Amhalghaidh which was itself a Gaelicised form of the Old Norse name Óláfr.

People with the surname
Ben Cauley, (1947–2015), American, trumpet player, vocalist, and founding member of the Stax recording group.
Bud Cauley
Willie Cauley-Stein

English-language surnames
Patronymic surnames